The  (Sanskrit: पञ्च परमेष्ठी for "five supreme beings")  in Jainism are a fivefold hierarchy of religious authorities worthy of veneration.

Overview 

The five supreme beings are:
Arihant: The awakened souls who have attained keval gyan are considered as Arihant. The 24 Tirthankaraas or Jinas, the legendary founding figures of Jainism in the present time cycle are Arihants. All Tirthankaras are Arihants but not all Arihants are Thirthankars.
Siddha (Ashiri): The souls which have been liberated from the birth and death cycle.
Acarya
Upadhyaya ("Preceptors")
Muni or Jain monks

The five initials, viz. A+A+A+U+M are taken as forming the Aum syllable.

Five supreme beings 

Dravyasaṃgraha, a major Jain text, succinctly characterizes the five Supreme Beings (Pañca-Parameṣṭhi).

Definition of the World Teacher (Arhat) - verse 50.
Definition of the liberated souls (Siddha) - verses 51.
Definition of the Chief Preceptor (Acarya) - verse 52.
Definition of the Preceptor (Upadhyaya) - verse 53.
Definition of the Ascetic (Sadhu) - verse 54.

Arihant

See also
Namokar Mantra
Paramita
Jainism

Notes

References
 

Jain philosophy